Whitney Dylan (born in Memphis, Tennessee on August 16, 1976) is an American actress.

Life and career 
Whitney Dylan was born on August 16, 1976, in Memphis, Tennessee.

Her first on-screen appearance was a role as Lysette in the episode "The Zeppo" of The WB's horror television series Buffy the Vampire Slayer. Dylan had guest roles in television series Ryan Caulfield: Year One, ER, Angel, Special Unit 2, Charmed, Judging Amy and Desperate Housewives. Her film credits include Coyote Ugly (2000) and The Island (2005). She portrayed Sharon Tate in the television film Helter Skelter (2004).

Filmography

References

External links

American film actresses
American television actresses
1976 births
Actresses from Tennessee
Living people
21st-century American actresses